Karel Nováček was the defending champion, but chose to compete at Hilversum during the same week.

Ivan Lendl won the title by defeating Brad Gilbert 6–1, 6–0 in the final.

Seeds
The first eight seeds received a bye to the second round.

Draw

Finals

Top half

Section 1

Section 2

Bottom half

Section 3

Section 4

References

External links
 Official results archive (ATP)
 Official results archive (ITF)

1987 Grand Prix (tennis)